The 1924 Tulsa Golden Hurricane football team was an American football team that represented the University of Tulsa during the 1924 college football season. In their third year under head coach Howard Acher, the Golden Hurricane compiled a 1–6–1 record. The team played its home games at McNulty Park in Tulsa.

Schedule

References

Tulsa
Tulsa Golden Hurricane football seasons
Tulsa Golden Hurricane football